The 1993 St. Louis mayoral election was held on April 6, 1993 to elect the mayor of St. Louis, Missouri. It saw the election of Freeman Bosley Jr., the first African-American Mayor of St. Louis.

The election was preceded by party primaries on March 2.

Democratic primary

General election

References

Mayoral elections in St. Louis
St. Louis
1993 in Missouri